Bristol Township is a defunct township that was located in Philadelphia County, Pennsylvania. The township ceased to exist and was incorporated into the City of Philadelphia following the passage of the Act of Consolidation, 1854. It is the modern day Olney-Oak Lane Planning Analysis Section, though with a slight difference in the southern border. It is in present-day North Philadelphia, although Olney-Oak Lane is sometimes considered to be separate from North Philadelphia entirely because of their unique architecture, culture and differing patterns of development.

History
Bristol Township was located at the north end of Philadelphia County, at the intersection of the angle which runs down from the extreme point between Philadelphia and Montgomery counties. It was of irregular form, and was bounded on the northwest by a portion of Springfield Township, Montgomery County; on the northeast by Cheltenham Township, Montgomery County. It extended along the latter to Oxford Township, but was bounded mainly on the east by Tacony Creek, on the south partly by the Wingohocking and the Northern Liberties Township, and on the west and southwest by Germantown Borough and Germantown Township.

The Old York Road ran through it to Branchtown and Milestown (now East Oak Lane), and thence to Bucks County. Greatest length, 5½ miles; greatest breadth, 3 miles; area, 5,650 acres (23 km²). The name is derived from the city of Bristol in England.

Neighborhoods
East Oak Lane
Feltonville
Fern Rock
Koreatown
Logan
Melrose Park
Ogontz
Olney
West Oak Lane
Cedarbrook

Resources
Chronology of the Political Subdivisions of the County of Philadelphia, 1683–1854
Information courtesy of ushistory.org
Incorporated District, Boroughs, and Townships in the County of Philadelphia, 1854 By Rudolph J. Walther - excerpted from the book at the ushistory.org website
Ellet, Charles, Jr. Map of the County of Philadelphia from Actual Survey, 1843.

Municipalities in Philadelphia County prior to the Act of Consolidation, 1854